Helen Macpherson Schutt (née Helen Macpherson Smith, 1874–1951), was an Australian philanthropist.

Early life 
Helen Macpherson Smith was the only child of Australian born Jane Priscilla, née Macpherson, and Melbourne based, Scottish born timber merchant Robert Smith. She was born at Melrose, Scotland, on 17 April 1874. She lived at Fitzroy with her parents till she was seven years old and later she traveled to Europe, Britain, and Australia. Smith was partly educated at a Scottish boarding school, and at Hanover, Germany, in 1889 and later attended Presbyterian Ladies' College and learned music, German, dancing, and Elocution. She married a Barrister, William John Schutt on 11 December 1901 at Toorak Presbyterian Church, the wedding being widely reported in the press. In 1919, William Schutt became a Supreme Court Judge. He died in 1933 at Melbourne.

Trusts 
Schutt was involved in many charitable trusts like - Seamen, Royal Society for the Prevention of Cruelty to Animals, and Royal District Nursing Service. She left a huge amount to establish a charitable trust, Helen M. Schutt Trust. In 2001, the trust was renamed as the Helen Macpherson Smith Trust, and in honor of her memory, at the Melbourne General Cemetery, an obelisk was erected.

Death 
Schutt was childless and died of pneumonia on 19 April 1951, while staying at the Hotel Majestic at Cannes, France. She was buried in a pauper's grave at Marseilles for unexplained reasons and later exhumed, and later cremated.

References 

1874 births
1951 deaths
People from Melrose, Scottish Borders
Australian women philanthropists
Australian philanthropists
Deaths from pneumonia in France
19th-century Australian women
20th-century Australian women
British emigrants to Australia